Bang Klam is a district (amphoe) of Songkhla province, southern Thailand.

History
The minor district (king amphoe) was established on 7 January 1986 by splitting off four tambons from Hat Yai district. It was upgraded to a full district on 8 September 1995.

Geography
Neighboring districts are (from the south clockwise): Hat Yai, Rattaphum, and Khuan Niang. To the northeast is the Songkhla lake.

Administration

Central administration 
Bang Klam is divided into four sub-districts (tambons), which are further subdivided into 36 administrative villages (mubans).

Local administration 
There are two sub-district municipalities (thesaban tambons) in the district:
 Tha Chang consisting of sub-district Tha Chang.
 Ban Han consisting of sub-district Ban Han.

There are two subdistrict administrative organizations (SAO) in the district:
 Bang Klam consisting of sub-district Bang Klam.
 Mae Thom consisting of sub-district Mae Thom.

References

External links
amphoe.com

Districts of Songkhla province